Sina Helen Gibson Woolcott (24 August 1907 – 29 May 2003) was a New Zealand artist, born in Ba, Fiji.

Woolcott was educated at the Elam School of Fine Art in Auckland. She was a member of, and exhibited with: 
 Auckland Society of Arts
 New Zealand Academy of Fine Arts
 Rutland Group
 The Group in 1950

References

Further reading 
Artist files for Sina Woolcott are held at:
 E. H. McCormick Research Library, Auckland Art Gallery Toi o Tāmaki
 Hocken Collections Uare Taoka o Hākena

1907 births
2003 deaths
New Zealand painters
People associated with the Rutland Group
People from Ba (town)
Elam Art School alumni
University of Auckland alumni
New Zealand women painters
People associated with the Auckland Society of Arts
People associated with The Group (New Zealand art)